The Tumansky R-29 is a Soviet turbojet aircraft engine that was developed in the early 1970s. It is generally described as being in the "third generation" of Soviet gas turbine engines which are characterized by high thrust-to-weight ratios and the use of turbine air cooling.

Variants
R-29-300
Original variant. Used in the MiG-23MF and related variants.

R-29B-300
Simplified variant of the engine intended for the MiG-27.

R-29PN
Advanced variant that replaced the -300 model on non-export aircraft.

R-29BS-300
Variant with modified gearbox. Used in several export variants of the Sukhoi Su-17.

Khatchaturov R-35-300
Developed version used in late variants of the MiG-23.

Shenyang WP-15
Chinese reverse-engineered copy of the R-29-300.

Applications
IAR 95 (Intended application)
Mikoyan-Gurevich MiG-23
Mikoyan MiG-27
 Chengdu J-10 (Prototype)
Shenyang J-13 (Intended application)
Sukhoi Su-22

Specifications (R-29-300)

See also

References

Citations

Sources 

 Gunston, Bill. World Encyclopaedia of Aero Engines. Cambridge, England. Patrick Stephens Limited, 1989. .

External links 

R-29 on leteckemotory.cz 

Tumansky aircraft engines
1970s turbojet engines